Rocco Travella (born 30 June 1967) is a Swiss former cyclist. He competed at the 1988 Summer Olympics and the 1992 Summer Olympics.

References

External links
 

1967 births
Living people
Swiss male cyclists
Olympic cyclists of Switzerland
Cyclists at the 1988 Summer Olympics
Cyclists at the 1992 Summer Olympics
People from Mendrisio
Sportspeople from Ticino